Khomruduiyeh (also Romanized as Khomrūdū’īyeh; also known as Khom Rūtūyeh) is a village in Khenaman Rural District, in the Central District of Rafsanjan County, Kerman Province, Iran. At the 2006 census, its population was 25, in 7 families.

References 

Populated places in Rafsanjan County